Coleophora ammophora is a moth of the family Coleophoridae. It is found in Turkey.

The larvae feed on Artemisia badhysi. They feed on the leaves of their host plant.

References

ammophora
Endemic fauna of Turkey
Moths described in 1989
Moths of Asia